L'Anse Creuse High School is a public, magnet high school in Harrison Township, Michigan, United States. It is one of two high schools in the L'Anse Creuse Public Schools district, with the other being L'Anse Creuse High School - North.

Demographics
The demographic breakdown of the 1,629 students enrolled in 2012-2013 was:
Male - 48.8%
Female - 51.2%
Native American/Alaskan - 0.4%
Asian/Pacific islanders - 1.1%
Black - 14.5%
Hispanic - 2.5%
White - 77.6%
Multiracial - 3.8%

Additionally, 33.9% of the students were eligible for free or reduced lunch.

Notable alumni
 Uncle Kracker, musician and rapper
 Lary Sorensen, former Detroit Tigers announcer and former MLB player

References

External links
 L'Anse Creuse High School

Public high schools in Michigan
Schools in Macomb County, Michigan